Poole Civic Centre is an Art Deco municipal building in Poole, Dorset. Since 7 October 2019 the building has been a Grade II listed building. Also sometimes known as Poole Town Hall, the civic centre was the headquarters of Poole Borough Council until 2019.

History 
The first town hall in Poole was a structure in Market Street, now known as the Poole Guildhall, which was completed in 1761. After deciding that the guildhall was too cramped, civic leaders decided to procure a new civic centre: the site they selected was open land facing the junction between Parkstone Road and Sandbanks Road.

Foundation stones for the new building were laid by the Lord Mayor of London, Sir William Neal, and the mayor of Poole, Alderman John Arthur Rogers on 16 May 1931. It was designed in the Art Deco style by L. Magnus Austin, built by Whitelock and Co. of Branksome and was officially opened by the Earl of Shaftesbury on 28 May 1932. The design involved a symmetrical main frontage with nine bays with the end bays canted forwards; the central section of three bays featured a full-height archway with a doorway on the ground floor and a recess on the first and second floors containing a balcony on the first floor and windows on the first and second floors; there was an open pediment containing the borough coat of arms above the archway. Internally, the principal rooms were the council chamber, the mayor's parlour and the courtroom.

The town hall continued to serve as the headquarters of Poole Borough Council and became the local seat of government of the enlarged local government district of Poole in 1974. An extension to the rear, creating an enclosed courtyard, was added in the 1980s. The building went on to become the home of the new unitary authority, Poole Borough Council, in April 1997.

In 2016 proposals were considered which involved demolition of the building and redevelopment of the site for housing, but the plans were rejected. Instead civic leaders decided to improve the building and some £250,000 was spent on refurbishment, including disabled access, baby changing facilities and areas for customer interviews, later that year. The building ceased to be the local seat of government when Bournemouth, Christchurch and Poole Council, an enlarged unitary authority, was created in April 2019. It was reported in August 2020 that the new council intended to sell the building for redevelopment.

Park and ride 
The car park adjacent to the building was used as a mobile testing centre during the COVID-19 pandemic and, in 2021, it became a park and ride facility.

References

External links 
 Official website

Grade II listed buildings in Dorset
Government buildings completed in 1932
Buildings and structures in Poole
City and town halls in Dorset
Art Deco architecture in England